The Hawaii National Lawn Tennis team represented the Territory of Hawaii in the International Lawn Tennis Challenge (now the Davis Cup). They participated in only one tie, losing 4–1 to Australia in the 1923 America Zone. They entered the tournaments in 1922 and 1925, but withdrew before competing.

Players

1923 International Lawn Tennis Challenge

Bracket

International Lawn Tennis Challenge tie

See also
Davis Cup
United States Davis Cup team

References

External links

δ Hawaii
Tennis in Hawaii